The Mapping Festival is an international festival dedicated to live visuals, installation art and VJing. Held annually in Geneva, Switzerland, it features audiovisual and VJ performances in nightclubs and installations in gallery spaces.

History

Mapping Festival took place in the following years
2005
2006
2007
2008
2009
2010
2011
2012

2012 festival
The 2012 Mapping Festival will take place from May 10–20 in Geneva (Switzerland).

The following venues hosted events for the 2012 Mapping Festival:

Le Commun (BAC)
Cinéma Spoutnik / Usine
Fonderie Kugler
Théâtre du Galpon
Théâtre de l'Usine / Usine
La Gravière
Zoo / Usine
Musée d'art et d'histoire (MAH)

2010 festival 
The 2010 Mapping Festival took place between May 6 and May 16, 2010 in Geneva (Switzerland).

The following venues hosted events for the 2010 Mapping Festival:

Bâtiment d’art contemporain (BAC)
Cinéma Spoutnik / Usine
Espace St Gervais
MÀD
Théâtre de la Parfumerie
Théâtre du Grütli
Zoo / Usine

2009 festival
The 2009 Mapping Festival took place between May 8 and May 17 May 2009 in Geneva (Switzerland).

References

External links 
 The official site of Mapping Festival

Festivals in Switzerland
Spring (season) events in Switzerland